Wonhee Anne Joh is an author, theologian, professor, and lecturer who has contributed to the disciplines of religion, women's equality, and Asian American Studies.

Career 
Joh is a Professor of Theology and Culture at Garrett-Evangelical Theological Seminary in Evanston, Illinois. She also serves as an invited affiliate faculty in the Department of Religious Studies and the Asian American Studies Program and she is a faculty member in the Religion and Global Politics Group (Buffett Institute) at Northwestern University in Evanston, Illinois. Describing her teaching philosophy, Joh stated "As a teacher, I believe that transformative praxis begins with each of us in our everyday lives.  Theological reflection is crucial because the meaning of our lives is often understood through the prism of religious experience. Therefore, theological reflection must be bold and imaginative as well as grounded in the material reality of the history of peoples' lives."

Heart of the Cross: A Postcolonial Christology 
Joh's 2006 book Heart of the Cross: A Postcolonial Christology utilizes the Korean concept of jeong to construct "a theology that is feminist, political and love-centred, while acknowledging the cross as a source of pain and suffering." Heart of The Cross uses postcolonial theory as well as post-structuralism, psychoanalysis, and liberationist feminist hermeneutics. The book investigates Christology by drawing on Joh's Korean American experience.

Works 
 Heart of the Cross: A Postcolonial Christology. Louisville: Westminster John Knox Press, 2006
 Terror, Trauma and Mourning: A Postcolonial Theology of Hope.  Under contract and forthcoming with Fordham University Press.
 Engaging the United States as a Military Empire: Critical Studies of Christianity from Asian/Asian North American Perspectives. Ed. Anne Joh and Nami Kim. New York, NY: Palgrave, 2016.
 Korean Christian LGBT: A Critical Approach. Ed. Anne Joh and Nami Kim. Forthcoming.

References 

South Korean writers
Living people
Year of birth missing (living people)